Money is a surname. Notable people with the surname include:

C. V. Money, American college sports coach
Della Money, British speech and language therapist
Don Money, American baseball player
Eddie Money (1949–2019), stage name of Edward Mahoney, American rock singer and songwriter
Eldon A. Money (1930–2020), American politician, farmer, and rancher
Ernle Money (1931–2013), English Conservative politician, MP for Ipswich
Griffin Money (1865–1958), Australian politician
Hernando Money (1839–1912), American politician in Mississippi
John Money, New Zealander-American psychologist
Ken Money, Canadian astronaut and scientist
Monte Money, American musician, founding member of Escape The Fate
Richard Money (born 1955), English footballer and football manager
Walter Money (1848–1924), English clergyman and cricketer
William Taylor Money (1769–1834), English East India company navy captain and MP